The Mazepa family was a noble Ruthenian/Ukrainian family. Their origin can be traced back to 1544, when the Ukrainian szlachtych Mykola Mazepa-Koledynski was given a khutor (farmstead) Kamyanets (which later grew to become the village of Mazepyntsi) by King Sigismund I for his duty.

Mykola Mazepa-Koledynski had two grandsons:
 Fedir Mykhaylovych Mazepa – a Cossack otaman. He fought against the Poles together with Hryhory Loboda, Severyn Nalyvaiko & Krzysztof Kosiński. Later he was caught and together with Severyn Nalyvaiko was executed in Warsaw.
Stepan-Adam Mazepa. They had a son, Ivan, and a daughter, who later married Andrew Voynorovskiy.

Notable members
 Ivan Mazepa (1639–1709) – Hetman of Zaporizhian Host (1687–1709)
 Andriy Voynarovsky (1689-1740) - nephew and heir of Ivan Mazepa, member of the Zaporozhian Army 
 Isaak Mazepa (1884–1952) – Prime minister of Ukraine
 Anna Politkovskaya (1958–2006)

References

 
Ukrainian noble families